Wendy Turnbull, (born 26 November 1952) is a retired tennis player from Australia. During her career, she won nine Grand Slam titles, four of them in women's doubles and five of them in mixed doubles. She also was a three-time Grand Slam runner-up in singles and won 11 singles titles and 55 doubles titles.

Career
Turnbull turned professional in 1975. Her career high rankings were third in singles and fifth in doubles. She was ranked in the year-end world top 20 for 10 consecutive years (1977 through 1986) and in the year-end world top 10 for eight consecutive years from 1977 to 1984. She was nicknamed "Rabbit" by her peers because of her foot speed around the court.

Turnbull was a singles runner-up at the 1977 US Open, the 1979 French Open, and the 1980 Australian Open. She won four women's doubles titles and five mixed doubles titles at Grand Slam events.

She was a 12-time runner-up in Grand Slam doubles events: 11 times in women's doubles and one time in mixed doubles. Nine of her 11 women's doubles losses were to teams that included Martina Navratilova.

Turnbull teamed with Elizabeth Smylie to win the bronze medal in women's doubles at the 1988 Summer Olympics in Seoul. She is one of very few players to have a winning record against Steffi Graf (2–1 in head-to-head matches).

Turnbull was a member of Australia's Fed Cup team from 1977 through 1988, compiling a 46–16 overall win–loss record (17–8 in singles and 29–8 in doubles). She was the captain or coach of the team from 1985 to 1993.

In 1979, the Supersisters trading card set was produced and distributed; one of the cards featured Turnbull's name and picture.

Turnbull was appointed to the International Tennis Federation (ITF) Olympic Committee in 1991, the only player appointed to the committee. She also serves on the ITF's Fed Cup Committee.

Wendy Turnbull was made a Member of the Order of the British Empire in 1984. In December 1993, the city of Brisbane named a public park in her honour. She was inducted into the Australian Tennis Hall of Fame in 2009.

Significant finals

Grand Slam finals

Singles: 3 (3 runner-ups)

Doubles: 15 (4 titles, 11 runner-ups)

Mixed doubles: 6 (5 titles, 1 runner-up)

Olympics

Doubles

Smylie and Turnbull lost in the semifinals to Pam Shriver and Zina Garrison. In 1988, there was no bronze medal play off match, both beaten semifinal pairs received bronze medals.

Year-end championships finals

Doubles: 2 (1 title, 1 runner-up)

WTA career finals

Singles: 31 (11–20)

Doubles: 110 (55–55)

Grand Slam tournament timelines

Singles

Doubles

Mixed doubles

Note: The Australian Open was held twice in 1977, in January and December.

See also

 Performance timelines for all female tennis players who reached at least one Grand Slam final

Sources

External links
 
 
 
 

1952 births
Living people
Australian expatriate sportspeople in the United States
Australian female tennis players
French Open champions
Olympic bronze medalists for Australia
Olympic tennis players of Australia
Tennis players from Brisbane
Tennis players at the 1988 Summer Olympics
US Open (tennis) champions
Wimbledon champions
Olympic medalists in tennis
Grand Slam (tennis) champions in women's doubles
Grand Slam (tennis) champions in mixed doubles
Australian Members of the Order of the British Empire
Medalists at the 1988 Summer Olympics
20th-century Australian women
21st-century Australian women